Broutona  (Japanese 武魯頓島; Buroton-tō) is an uninhabited volcanic island located near the northern end of the southern Kuril Islands chain in the Sea of Okhotsk in the northwest Pacific Ocean. Its name is derived from William Robert Broughton, a British ship captain who charted many of the Kuril Islands during his voyages during the 18th century. Its original Ainu name was Makanruru, which translates roughly to "island in a strong current".

Geology

The mountain has not erupted in historic times. These cliffs are weak and are easily eroded by the sea.

History
Broutona appears to have never been inhabited. It appears on an official map showing the territories of Matsumae Domain, a feudal domain of Edo period Japan dated 1644, and these holdings were officially confirmed by the Tokugawa shogunate in 1715.  Subsequently, claimed by the Empire of Russia, sovereignty initially passed to Russia under the terms of the Treaty of Shimoda, but was returned to the Empire of Japan per the Treaty of Saint Petersburg along with the rest of the Kuril islands. The island was formerly administered as part of Uruppu District of Nemuro Subprefecture of Hokkaidō. After World War II, the island came under the control of the Soviet Union, and is now administered as part of the Sakhalin Oblast of the Russian Federation.

Fauna

In the spring and summer northern fulmar and fork-tailed storm petrel nest on the island.

See also
List of volcanoes in Russia

References

Further reading 
 Gorshkov, G. S. Volcanism and the Upper Mantle Investigations in the Kurile Island Arc. Monographs in geoscience. New York: Plenum Press, 1970. 
 Krasheninnikov, Stepan Petrovich, and James Greive. The History of Kamtschatka and the Kurilski Islands, with the Countries Adjacent. Chicago: Quadrangle Books, 1963. 
 Rees, David. The Soviet Seizure of the Kuriles. New York: Praeger, 1985.  
 Takahashi, Hideki, and Masahiro Ōhara. Biodiversity and Biogeography of the Kuril Islands and Sakhalin. Bulletin of the Hokkaido University Museum, no. 2-. Sapporo, Japan: Hokkaido University Museum, 2004.

Islands of the Sea of Okhotsk
Islands of the Russian Far East
Stratovolcanoes of Russia
Islands of the Kuril Islands
Uninhabited islands of Russia
Uninhabited islands of the Pacific Ocean
Volcanoes of the Kuril Islands
Mountains of the Kuril Islands